James Craufurd may refer to:

 James Craufurd, Lord Ardmillan (1805–1876), Scottish judge
 James Craufurd (British Army officer) (1804–1888), British general

See also
 James Crawford (disambiguation)